The Acrrington/Rossendale Built-up area is an urban area which extends from the town of Accrington to Rawtenstall and Bacup in Lancashire, England. The area takes in parts of the boroughs of Hyndburn and Rossendale and includes villages and towns that surround Accrington, Rawtenstall and Bacup. The area was recorded at having a population of 125,059. The area was two separate urban areas according to the 2001 census  but were combined into one for the 2011 census. According to the 2001 census the Accrington urban area had a population of 71,000 whilst the Rossendale Urban Area had a population of 49,000.

According to the 2011 census, the gender makeup of the population was 61,590 male and 63,469 female. The ethnic makeup of the whole urban area was under 89% white and nearly over 10% Asian. Other ethnic minorities were just under 1%. The religious make up of the whole area was:

References

Accrington
Borough of Rossendale
Lancashire
Urban areas of England